The South African Railways Class NG5 2-8-2 of 1922 was a narrow-gauge steam locomotive.

In 1922, the South African Railways placed six narrow-gauge steam locomotives with a  Mikado type wheel arrangement in service on the Otavi Railway in South West Africa. When a system of grouping narrow-gauge locomotives into classes was eventually introduced somewhere between 1928 and 1930, they were designated Class NG5.

Manufacturer
Six narrow-gauge  steam locomotives  were built for the South African Railways (SAR) by Henschel and Son in Germany in 1921. They were built to the same design as the three Class Hd locomotives which had been built in 1912 for the German administration in German South West Africa (GSWA) for leasing to the Otavi Mining and Railway Company. The locomotives, numbered in the range from NG71 to NG76, were delivered in 1922.

Characteristics
Like their predecessor Class Hd, they were superheated, with Walschaerts valve gear and outside plate frames. The new locomotives differed from the Class Hd in having different boilers, which were of the same dimensions but with a different tube arrangement and, as a consequence, a slightly reduced total heating surface.

In keeping with SAR practice at the time, they had vacuum train brakes instead of the air brakes which the Class Hd was equipped with. They had slide valves which was unusual on a superheated locomotive, instead of piston valves like the Class Hd. As built, the sand boxes were mounted on top of the boiler between the chimney and the steam dome.

Their rigidly mounted leading and trailing carrying wheels were also arranged as radial axles to allow for sideways motion of the wheels in relation to the locomotive frame, since the locomotive did not have separate bogie trucks.

Classification
In service, these six locomotives and the three Class Hd locomotives were operated in a common pool. The system of grouping narrow-gauge locomotives into classes was only adopted by the SAR at some date between 1928 and 1930. At that point, these six locomotives and the three Class Hd locomotives were all designated Class NG5.

Service
The 1922-vintage Class NG5 was placed in service on the  narrow-gauge line from Swakopmund on the Atlantic coast to Tsumeb and Grootfontein in South West Africa (SWA). They spent their whole service life in SWA, except for a brief period when one of them was sent to the Avontuur Railway in the Eastern Cape for trials. However, since it jammed on the tighter curves in the Langkloof despite having one set of flangeless coupled wheels, it was soon returned to SWA.

The Class NG5 were all withdrawn from service when the narrow-gauge system in SWA was regauged to Cape gauge in 1960. Since they were unsuitable for use in the Langkloof, all six 1922-vintage Class NG5 locomotives were sold as scrap in 1962.

Preservation
Two of the 1912-vintage ex Class Hd locomotives were preserved and plinthed at Otjiwarongo and Usakos respectively.

References

2580
2-8-2 locomotives
1D1 locomotives
Henschel locomotives
600 mm gauge railway locomotives
Railway locomotives introduced in 1922
1922 in South Africa
Scrapped locomotives